Collège de La Confiance is a confessional college located in Beau-Bassin, Mauritius.

References

External links
 College de La Confiance Old Boys
 

Higher education in Mauritius
Beau Bassin-Rose Hill
Educational institutions established in 1970